Jean-Marc Destine (born 17 January 1973) is a Haitian retired middle-distance runner who specialised in the 800 metres. He represented his country at the 1996 Summer Olympics, as well as one outdoor and two indoor World Championships.

International competitions

Personal bests
Outdoor
800 metres – 1:45.79 (Eagle Rock 1996)
1000 metres – 2:22.89 (Arnhem 1997)
1500 metres - 3:50.25 (San Diego 1997)

Indoor
800 metres – 1:47.80 (Sindelfingen 1997)
1000 metres – 2:24.88 (Cedar Falls 2000)

References

All-Athletics profile

1973 births
Living people
Haitian male middle-distance runners
World Athletics Championships athletes for Haiti
Olympic athletes of Haiti
Athletes (track and field) at the 1996 Summer Olympics
Pan American Games competitors for Haiti
Athletes (track and field) at the 1999 Pan American Games
Athletes (track and field) at the 2003 Pan American Games
Competitors at the 2002 Central American and Caribbean Games